Jesse McCarthy is an essayist, cultural critic, and assistant professor in English and African-American studies at Harvard University.

Publications

Non-fiction 
He is the author of Who Will Pay Reparations on My Soul?, an essay collection addressing questions such as: “What do people owe each other when debts accrued can never be repaid?”

Fiction 
His debut novel, The Fugitivities, was released June 2021. It's the story of Jonah Winters, a young black man forming his identity, with parts of the story in Brooklyn, Brazil, Montevideo and Paris. He cites Gustave Flaubert's Sentimental Education as an important source of inspiration.

Awards 
McCarthy was recipient of a literary Whiting Award 2022 (50.000 US Dollar) in the category non-fiction for his essay collection Who Will Pay Reparations on My Soul? granted by the Whiting Foundation in Brooklyn, New York City.

References 

Harvard University faculty
21st-century American novelists
Living people
Year of birth missing (living people)